Paul "Bud" Moore (December 7, 1940 – August 1, 2017) was an American NASCAR driver born in Charleston, South Carolina. He was sometimes known as "Little Bud" to avoid confusion with a NASCAR owner with the same name.

Career
Moore's first-ever race in NASCAR was in the Grand National Series on August 2, 1964. He started the race in a 1963 Ford, but dropped within three laps due to overheating problems.

His best season of his racing career was in 1965, where he managed to grab three top fives, seven top tens, and even a pole, driving Louis Weatherbee's No. 45 Plymouth and competing in just fourteen races. Moore's best season in the point standings, however, was in 1968, where he finished 29th in those standings. Bud's final race in his relatively short career was five years after his second to last race, at the 1973 Southern 500 at the Darlington Raceway. He only completed 174 of the 367 laps, retiring from the race due to engine problems in his 1971 Mercury.

Later years
Following his racing career, Moore continued his support by working in various areas, including promotions and collectibles.

He died on August 1, 2017, at age 76.

Motorsports career results

NASCAR
(key) (Bold – Pole position awarded by qualifying time. Italics – Pole position earned by points standings or practice time. * – Most laps led.)

Grand National Series

Winston Cup Series

Daytona 500

References

External links
 

1940 births
2017 deaths
Sportspeople from Charleston, South Carolina
Racing drivers from South Carolina
NASCAR drivers